Stuart Alexander Beake (born 18 September 1949) is a British Anglican priest; he served as Archdeacon of Surrey from 2005 until his retirement on 19 September 2017.

He was educated at King's College School, Emmanuel College, Cambridge and Cuddesdon College, Oxford.

References

1949 births
Living people
People educated at King's College School, London
Alumni of Emmanuel College, Cambridge
Archdeacons of Surrey